Pseudancistrus kwinti is a species of catfish in the family Loricariidae. It is native to South America, where it occurs in the Coppename River in Suriname. The species reaches  SL. P. kwinti was described in 2010 by Phil Willink of the Field Museum of Natural History, Jan Mol of Anton de Kom University of Suriname, and Barry Chernoff of Wesleyan University on the basis of distinctive morphology and coloration.

References 

Loricariidae
Fish described in 2010
Catfish of South America